Nemocardium is a genus of bivalves belonging to the family Cardiidae.

The genus has almost cosmopolitan distribution.

Species:

Nemocardium australojaponicum 
Nemocardium bechei 
Nemocardium carteri 
Nemocardium cooperii 
Nemocardium diversa 
Nemocardium enigmaticum 
Nemocardium eugenense 
Nemocardium fulvum 
Nemocardium granosulcatum 
Nemocardium hadraterum 
Nemocardium jamaicense 
Nemocardium lene
Nemocardium nicoletti
Nemocardium patulum 
Nemocardium probatum 
Nemocardium salrivale
Nemocardium semiasperum 
Nemocardium serum 
Nemocardium textum 
Nemocardium toriii 
Nemocardium turgidum 
Nemocardium yokoyamai

References

Cardiidae
Bivalve genera